Dolichyl-P-Man:Man(5)GlcNAc(2)-PP-dolichyl mannosyltransferase is an enzyme that, in humans, is encoded by the ALG3 gene.

This gene encodes a member of the ALG3 family. The encoded protein catalyses the addition of the first dol-P-Man derived mannose in an alpha 1,3 linkage to Man5GlcNAc2-PP-Dol. Defects in this gene have been associated with congenital disorder of glycosylation type Id (CDG-Id) characterized by abnormal N-glycosylation.

References

Further reading

External links
  GeneReviews/NCBI/NIH/UW entry on Congenital Disorders of Glycosylation Overview